Portland, Oregon, has an extensive public art collection. Displayed artworks undergo an approval process. Many of the artworks are administered by the Regional Arts & Culture Council.

Several statues were toppled during the 2020s, including ones depicting Thomas Jefferson, George Washington, Abraham Lincoln, and Teddy Roosevelt.  The Promised Land, the Thompson Elk Fountain, and a statue of Harvey W. Scott were also removed.

Mosaics, murals, and paintings

Mosaics, mural, and paintings have included:
 Black Lives Matter street mural (2020)
 Capax Infiniti (2014), Faith47
 Conduit (2009–2010), Emily Ginsburg
 George Floyd mural (2020)
 Lovejoy Columns
 Never Look Away (2021)
 Oregon History (1989–1990), Richard Haas
 Packy mural (1990, destroyed in 2008), Eric Larsen
 Portland Memorial Mausoleum Mural (2009), Dan Cohen and Shane Bennett
 The Continuity of Life Forms, Willard Martin
 The Knowledge (2010), Harrell Fletcher and Avalon Kalin
 Tri It (2015), Blaine Fontana
 We Stand with You (2021)
 Women Making History in Portland (2007), Robin Corbo
 Woodstock Mural (2013, original, 2015 reproduction), Mike Lawrence

Sculpture
Sculptures have included:
 Garden Wreath (1997), Larry Kirkland, Central Library 
 Mago Hermano (Brother Wizard or Magician) (2003), Antoinette Hatfield Hall
 Solar Wreath (1997), Larry Kirkland, Central Library

Outdoor sculptures

 118 Modules (1979), John Rogers
 Ainu and Native American power boards
 Allow Me (1983), John Seward Johnson II
 Alluvial Wall (2001), Peter Nylen
 Along These Lines (2005), Anne Storrs
 Animals in Pools (1986), Georgia Gerber
 Artwall (2005), Herbert Dreiseitl
 Ascension (1996), Robert Calvo
 Awning (1976), Douglas Senft
 Bell Circles II
 Broken Wall Memorial
 Brushstrokes (1996), Roy Lichtenstein
 Burls Will Be Burls (2009), Bruce Conkle
 The Burnside Nest (2014), Hannes Wingate
 Bust of York (2021)
 Cairns (2008), Christine Bourdette
 Capitalism (1991), Larry Kirkland
 Captain William Clark Monument (1988)
 Cat in Repose (1997), Kathleen McCullough (née Conchuratt)
 Charles Frederic Swigert Jr. Memorial Fountain (1983), Richard Beyer
 Chiming Fountain (1891), John "Hans" Staehli
 Chinatown Gateway (1986)
 City Reflections (2009), Patti Warashina
 Coming of the White Man (1904), Hermon Atkins MacNeil
 Constellation (2000), Tad Savinar
 Contact II (1972), Alexander Liberman
 Continuation (2009), Michihiro Kosuge
 Da Tung and Xi'an Bao Bao (2002)
 Daddy Long Legs (2006), Mel Katz
 Dog Bowl (2002), William Wegman
 The Dream (1998), Michael Florin Dente
 The Dreamer (1979), Manuel Izquierdo
 Driver's Seat (1994), Don Merkt
 Echo Gate (2001), Ean Eldred
 Electronic Poet (1984), Keith Jellum
 Equestrian statue of Joan of Arc, Emmanuel Frémiet
 Facing the Crowd (2001), Michael Stutz
 Farewell to Orpheus (1968–1973), Frederic Littman
 Festival Lanterns (2006), Brian Goldbloom
 Floribunda (1998), Mark Calderon
 Folly Bollards (1998), Valerie Otani
 Fountain for Company H (1914), John H. Beaver
 Frank E. Beach Memorial Fountain (1975), Lee Kelly
 Friendship Circle (1990), Lee Kelly and Michael Stirling
 From Within Shalom (1984), Steve Gillman
 Ghost Ship (2001), James Harrison
 The Green Man of Portland (2009), Daniel Duford
 Heart Beacon (2013), Blessing Hancock and Joe O'Connell
 Holon (1978–1979, re-carved 2003–2004), Donald Wilson
 Host Analog (1991), Buster Simpson
 Howard's Way (2007), Lee Kelly
 Ideals (1992), Muriel Castanis
 In the Shadow of the Elm (1984), Paul Sutinen
 Interlocking Forms (1977), Donald Wilson
 Inversion: Plus Minus (2012), Annie Han and Daniel Mihalyo
 John Fitzgerald Kennedy Memorial (1965)
 Kerf (2015), Thomas Sayre
 Korean Temple Bell (1989)
 Kvinneakt (1973–1975), Norman J. Taylor
 Leland I (1975), Lee Kelly and Bonnie Bronson
 Lewis and Clark Memorial Column (1908), Otto Schumann
 Liberty Bell (1963, destroyed in 1970; replaced in 1972)
 Little Prince (1995), Ilan Averbuch
 Loyal B. Stearns Memorial Fountain (1941), A. E. Doyle and Associates
 Memorial Fountain, Skidmore, Owings & Merrill
 Memory 99, Lee Kelly
 Mimir (1980), Keith Jellum
 Nash (1978–1979), Lee Kelly
 Nepenthes (2013), Dan Corson
 O Cruceiro (1986)
 Oddo Memorial
 Oregon Landscape (1962), Thomas Hardy
 Oregon Holocaust Memorial (2004)
 Oregon Irish Famine Memorial
 Passage (2014), Bill Will
 Peace Chant (1984), Steve Gillman
 People's Bike Library of Portland (2009), Brian Borrello and Vanessa Renwick
 Perpetuity (1970), Alexander von Svoboda
 Pioneer Woman (1956), Frederic Littman
 Pod (2002), Pete Beeman
 Portland Immigrant Statue (2011), Jim Gion
 Portlandia (1985), Raymond Kaskey
 The Promised Land (1993), David Manuel
 The Quest (1970), Alexander von Svoboda
 The Responsibility of Raising a Child (2004), Rick Bartow
 Ring of Time (1965–1967), Hilda Grossman Morris
 The Rippling Wall (2014), David Franklin
 River Legend (1976), Dimitri Hadzi
 Royal Rosarian (2011), Bill Bane
 Running Horses (1986), Tom Hardy
 Sacajawea and Jean-Baptiste (1905), Alice Cooper
 Salmon Cycle Marker (2005)
 The Scout
 Sculpture Stage (1976), Bruce West
 Shemanski Fountain (1926), Carl L. Linde, and Rebecca at the Well (1928), Oliver L. Barrett
 Silicon Forest (2003), Brian Borrello
 Silver Dawn (1980), Manuel Izquierdo
 Skidmore Fountain (1888), Olin Levi Warner
 Soaring Stones (1990), John T. Young
 Spanish–American War Soldier's Monument (1906), Douglas Tilden
 Spanish–American War Veterans Memorial
 Stack Stalk (2001), Ean Eldred
 Statue of Abraham Lincoln (1928), George Fite Waters
 Statue of Benjamin Franklin (1942), George Berry
 Statue of George Washington (1926–1927), Pompeo Coppini
 Statue of Harvey W. Scott (1933), Gutzon Borglum
 Statue of Paul Bunyan (1959)
 Statue of Vera Katz (2006), Bill Bane
 Stratum (2016), Mikyoung Kim
 Streetcar Stop for Portland (2013), Jorge Pardo
 Talos No. 2 (1959–1977), James Lee Hansen
 Tecotosh (2005–2006), Ed Carpenter
 Terra Incognita (1995), Ilan Averbuch
 Theodore Roosevelt Memorial (1939)
 Theodore Roosevelt, Rough Rider (1922), Alexander Phimister Proctor
 This All Happened More or Less (2014), Crystal Schenk and Shelby Davis
 Thomas Jefferson (1915), Karl Bitter
 Thompson Elk Fountain (1900), Roland Hinton Perry
 Thor (1977), Melvin Schuler
 Three Figures (1991–1992), Mark Bulwinkle
 Tikitotmoniki Totems (2001), Kenny Scharf
 Transcendence, Keith Jellum
 Tree of Life (1964), Lee Kelly and Bonnie Bronson
 Triad (1980, remade 2003), Evelyn Franz
 Trigger 4 (1979), Lee Kelly
 Trio (2013), Elizabeth Conner
 Unfolding Rhythms (1987), Manuel Izquierdo
 Untitled (1977), John Killmaster
 Untitled (1977), Ivan Morrison
 Untitled (1977), Bruce West
 Upstream Downtown (1992), Gary Hirsch
 Urban Hydrology (2009), Fernanda D'Agostino
 Uroboros (1979), Charles Kibby
 Velosaurus (2015), Horatio Law
 Ventana al Pacifico (1989), Manuel Neri
 Victory Bell
 Voices of Remembrance
 Water, Please (1997), Don Merkt
 We Have Always Lived Here (2015), Greg A. Robinson
 Weather Machine (1988), Omen Design Group Inc.
 Whistlestop for an Organ Teacher (2009), Cris Bruch
 Wind Gate, Hilda Grossman Morris
 Winter Rider No. 2 (2003), James Lee Hansen
 Yankee Champion (1985), Thomas Morandi
 York: Terra Incognita (2010), Alison Saar
 You Are Here (2012), Ron Baron

References

External links

 

Portland, Oregon
Portland
Portland, Oregon-related lists